The Slovenian National Party (SNS) is a nationalist political party in Slovenia led by Zmago Jelinčič Plemeniti. The party is known for its Euroscepticism and opposes Slovenia's membership in NATO. It also engages in what many consider to be historical negationism of events in Slovenia during World War II.

History 
The party was founded on 17 March 1991 by Zmago Jelinčič Plemeniti, who remains the party's leader. The traditional 19th century Kozler map of United Slovenia is one of the official party symbols.

In 1993, dissenting factions broke from the party and formed the Slovenian National Right and the National Party of Labor. Many of the dissenting members were supporters of Slovene Home Guard and objected to Jelinčič's support of the Slovene Partisans. Another split occurred in 2008, when several Slovenian National Party MPs left the party and formed the party Lipa. These splits did not seriously affect the party's structure, even though the ideologies of both SNS MPs and the party's membership tend to sometimes differ from Jelinčič's stands.

In the second democratic elections in Slovenia on 6 and 10 December 1992, the SNS received 10.2% of the vote and 12 of the 90 seats in parliament. On 10 November 1996, their share of the vote declined to 3.22% and the party won 4 seats. On 15 October 2000, the party's share of the vote increased to 4.38% and its seats in parliament remained steady at 4. In the 2002 presidential election, SNS leader Zmago Jelinčič Plemeniti received 8.49% of the vote, placing third. On 3 October 2004, the party's share of the vote increased to 6.27% and the party won 6 seats in parliament. The party's share of the vote increased to 4.0% in the 2014 European parliamentary election compared to the previous European elections, but it did not win any seats. In the 2007 presidential election, Jelinčič increased his share to 19.16% of the vote, but placed fourth. In Slovenian legislative elections on 21 September 2008, the party's share of the vote declined to 5.4% and its seats in parliament dropped to 5. The party's share of the vote dropped to 2.9% in the 2009 European parliamentary election. In the Slovenian parliamentary election on 4 December 2011, the party received 1.80% of votes and lost its representation in parliament as it did not reach the parliamentary threshold of 4%. In the Slovenian parliamentary election on 13 July 2014, the party received 2.21% of votes, but did not win any seats in parliament. It receives support from various strands of society and has traditionally done well among young voters and residents of the regions near the Italian and Austrian borders.

On 9 March 2016, Jelinčič and Vojislav Šešelj, president of the Serbian Radical Party, signed an agreement with the intention of bringing their parties closer in terms of partnership and political alliance.

In July 2020, the party reached a cooperation agreement with the 14th Government of Slovenia.

Ideology and platform
The party's ideology has been strongly anti-clerical and has advocated a firm laicist position. The party is also opposed to gay rights. The party opposes the privatisation of state-owned enterprises. The party opposes the introduction of a property tax and supports an increase in the minimum wage. The party has called for a change of the national flag and the coat of arms, feeling that they utilize symbols used by certain World War II paramilitary groups and lack a distinctly Slovenian historical character. The party supports replacing judges' lifetime mandate with an eight-year term. The party is opposed to Slovenia's membership the European Union and NATO.

Its leaders have been accused of chauvinist and even racist attitudes towards certain minorities, particularly Slovenia's Romani population. In the early 1990s, the party campaigned against allowing refugees from former Yugoslav republics into the country. The party has since moderated its rhetoric, although its leaders continue to voice strongly anti-Croat positions. Among other things, Jelinčič has proposed that four disputed villages; Bužini, Mlini, Škodelini and Škrile, be placed within the municipality of Piran for the purpose of participating in Slovenian elections. He also advocates improving relations with Serbia and has opposed the independence of Kosovo. The SNS frequently demands better treatment of Slovene minorities in neighboring countries.

Although the party usually refuses to position itself within a left–right political spectrum, its president Zmago Jelinčič Plemeniti defined himself as leftist in a 2000 interview for the magazine Mladina. However, the descriptions others have given the party range from left-wing to far-right, including right-wing. According to researchers at the University of Ljubljana, the SNS combines elements of right-wing and left-wing ideology and is not strictly a left-wing, nor a right-wing party, but nevertheless leans closer to the left. The party has been seen espousing more leftist economic policies (such as opposing privatization of key national enterprises), while maintaining right-wing social views, which at least partially explains the wide variance in placing it on the political spectrum.

Parliamentary representation

Electoral results

National Assembly

Presidential

European Parliament

References

External links
 Official website

1991 establishments in Slovenia
Conservative parties in Slovenia
Eurosceptic parties in Slovenia
Far-right parties in Europe
Nationalist parties in Slovenia
Organizations based in Ljubljana
Organizations that oppose LGBT rights
Political parties established in 1991
Protectionism
Right-wing populist parties
Right-wing populism in Slovenia
Opposition to NATO
Right-wing parties in Europe
Anti-clerical parties